Lovills Creek is a  long 3rd order tributary to the Ararat River in Surry County, North Carolina.  This is the only stream of this name in the United States.

Variant names
According to the Geographic Names Information System, it has also been known historically as:
Lovel Creek
Lovels Creek
Lovets Creek
Loving Creek

Course
Lovills Creek rises about 0.5 miles east of Wards Gap on the Pine Creek divide in Carroll County, Virginia.  Lovills Creek than flows south into Surry County, North Carolina to join the Ararat River at Mount Airy.

Watershed
Lovills Creek drains  of area, receives about 49.9 in/year of precipitation, has a wetness index of 318.89, and is about 57% forested.

See also
List of rivers of North Carolina

References

Rivers of North Carolina
Rivers of Virginia
Rivers of Surry County, North Carolina
Rivers of Carroll County, Virginia